Jalil Safarov (January 28, 1962, Marneuli Municipality, Georgia – May 15, 1992, Turshsu, Shusha, Azerbaijan) was the National Hero of Azerbaijan, and the warrior of the Karabakh war.

Life 
Jalil Safarov was born on January 28, 1962, in the Lejbaddin village of Marneuli Municipality, Georgia. Then he moved to Sumgayit District of Azerbaijan with his family. He studied the secondary school in Sumgayit in 1969–1977. He was admitted to Jamshid Nakhchivanski Military Lyceum in 1977. After completing his education in 1980, he entered Vladikavkaz Military Racquet & Zenith Command School. He had been working in Priozorsk and Balhash cities of Kazakhstan since 1984 and returned to Azerbaijan eight years later.

Military activities 
Jalil Safarov arrived in Karabakh by the appointment of the Defense Ministry and remained here after finishing his service. He participated in the battles around Shusha District against the Armenian Army. On May 15, 1992, Jalil Safarov was killed heroically in the battles in the direction of Turshsu-Zardisli village of Shusha.

Memorial 
By the Decree of the President of the Republic of Azerbaijan No. 831 dated 6 June 1992, Jalil Safarov was posthumously awarded the honorary title of "National Hero of Azerbaijan". He was buried in the Martyrs' Lane in Baku. School No. 10 in Sumgayit is named after our him. His monument was erected in Marneuli, Georgia.

See also 
 First Nagorno-Karabakh War

References

Sources 
Vugar Asgarov. Azərbaycanın Milli Qəhrəmanları (Yenidən işlənmiş II nəşr). Bakı: "Dərələyəz-M", 2010, səh. 260.

1962 births
1992 deaths
Azerbaijani military personnel
Azerbaijani military personnel of the Nagorno-Karabakh War
Azerbaijani military personnel killed in action
National Heroes of Azerbaijan
People from Kvemo Kartli